Kobe Bean Bryant (August 23, 1978 – January 26, 2020) was an American professional basketball player. A shooting guard, he spent his entire 20-year career with the Los Angeles Lakers in the National Basketball Association (NBA). Widely regarded as one of the greatest basketball players and scorers of all time, Bryant won five NBA championships, was an 18-time All-Star, a 15-time member of the All-NBA Team, a 12-time member of the All-Defensive Team, the 2008 NBA Most Valuable Player (MVP), and a two-time NBA Finals MVP. Bryant also led the NBA in scoring twice, and ranks fourth in league all-time regular season and postseason scoring. He was posthumously voted into the Naismith Memorial Basketball Hall of Fame in 2020 and named to the NBA 75th Anniversary Team in 2021.

The son of former NBA player Joe Bryant, he was born in Philadelphia and partly raised in Italy. Recognized as the top American high-school basketball player while at Philadelphia suburb Lower Merion, Bryant declared for the 1996 NBA draft and was selected by the Charlotte Hornets with the 13th overall pick; he was then traded to the Lakers. As a rookie, Bryant earned a reputation as a high-flyer by winning the 1997 Slam Dunk Contest, and was named an All-Star by his second season. Despite a feud with teammate Shaquille O'Neal, the pair led the Lakers to three consecutive NBA championships from 2000 to 2002.

In 2003, Bryant was charged with sexual assault; with the alleged victim being a 19-year-old hotel employee. Criminal charges were later dropped after the accuser failed to testify, and a lawsuit was settled out of court, with Bryant issuing a public apology and admitting to a sexual encounter he maintained was consensual. The accusation briefly tarnished Bryant's reputation, resulting in the loss of several of his endorsement contracts.

After the Lakers lost the 2004 NBA Finals, O'Neal was traded and Bryant became the cornerstone of the franchise. He led the NBA in scoring in the 2005–06 and 2006–07 seasons and was named league MVP in 2008. On January 22, 2006, he scored a career-high 81 points; the second most points scored in a single NBA game, behind Wilt Chamberlain's 100-point game. Bryant led the team to consecutive championships in 2009 and 2010, being named NBA Finals MVP on both occasions. He continued to be among the premier players in the league through the 2012–13 season, when he suffered a torn achilles tendon at age 34. His next two seasons were cut short by injuries to his knee and shoulder, respectively. Citing physical decline, Bryant retired after the 2015–16 season. In 2017, the Lakers retired both his Nos. 8 and 24, making him the only player in NBA history to have multiple numbers retired by the same franchise.

The all-time leading scorer in Lakers history, Bryant was the first guard in NBA history to play 20 seasons. His 18 All-Star designations are the second most all time, and he has the second most consecutive appearances as a starter. Bryant's four NBA All-Star Game MVP Awards are tied with Bob Pettit for the most in NBA history. He gave himself the nickname "Black Mamba" in the mid-2000s, and the epithet became widely adopted by the general public. He won gold medals on the 2008 and 2012 U.S. Olympic teams. In 2018, he won the Academy Award for Best Animated Short Film for the film Dear Basketball (2017).

Bryant died, along with his daughter Gianna and seven others, in a helicopter crash in Calabasas, California, in 2020. A number of tributes and memorials were subsequently issued, including renaming the All-Star MVP Award in his honor.

Early life
Bryant was born on August  23, 1978, in Philadelphia, the youngest of three children and the only son of Pamela Cox Bryant and former NBA player Joe Bryant. He was also the maternal nephew of NBA player John "Chubby" Cox. His parents named him after the famous beef of Kobe, Japan, which they saw on a restaurant menu. His middle name, Bean, was derived from his father's nickname "Jellybean". Bryant's family was Catholic and he was brought up with this faith.

Bryant started playing basketball when he was three, and the Lakers were his favorite team when he was growing up. When Bryant was six, his father retired from the NBA and moved his family to Rieti in Italy to continue playing professional basketball. After two years, they moved first to Reggio Calabria, then to Pistoia and Reggio Emilia. Kobe became accustomed to his new lifestyle and learned to speak fluent Italian. He was especially fond of Reggio Emilia, which he considered a loving place and where some of his best childhood memories were made. Bryant began to play basketball seriously while living in Reggio Emilia. Bryant's grandfather would mail him videos of NBA games for Bryant to study. Another source of inspiration was animated European films about sports, from which he learned more about basketball. From 1987 to 1989, his father played for Olimpia Basket Pistoia where he paired with former Detroit Pistons Leon Douglas.  Kobe would work at the games as a ball and mop boy and would practice shooting at halftime, with Douglas sharing, "At every one of our games at halftime, it was the Kobe show.  He'd get out there and get his shot up.  We'd come out of the locker room at halftime and have to chase him off the court".

Bryant also learned to play soccer, and his favorite soccer team was A.C. Milan. During summers, Bryant would come back to the United States to play in a basketball summer league. When Bryant was 13, he and his family moved back to Philadelphia, where he enrolled in eighth grade at Bala Cynwyd Middle School.

High school (1992–1996)

Bryant earned national recognition during a spectacular high-school career at Lower Merion High School in Ardmore, located in the Philadelphia suburb of Lower Merion. He played on the varsity basketball team as a freshman. Bryant became the first freshman in decades to start for Lower Merion's varsity team, but the team finished with a 4–20 record. The following three years, the Aces compiled a 77–13 record, with Bryant playing all five positions. During his junior year, he averaged 31.1 points, 10.4 rebounds, 5.2 assists, 3.8 blocks and 2.3 steals and was named Pennsylvania Player of the Year while also earning a fourth-team Parade All-American nomination, attracting attention from college recruiters in the process. Duke, Michigan, North Carolina and Villanova were at the top of his list. However, after high schooler Kevin Garnett went in the first round of the 1995 NBA draft, Bryant also began contemplating going directly to the pros.

At Adidas ABCD Camp, Bryant earned the 1995 senior MVP award while playing alongside future NBA teammate Lamar Odom. While in high school, then 76ers coach John Lucas invited Bryant to work out and scrimmage with the team, where he played one-on-one with Jerry Stackhouse. In his senior year of high school, Bryant led the Aces to their first state championship in 53 years. During the run, he averaged 30.8 points, 12 rebounds, 6.5 assists, 4 steals, and 3.8 blocked shots in leading the Aces to a 31–3 record. Bryant ended his high-school career as Southeastern Pennsylvania's all-time leading scorer at 2,883 points, surpassing both Wilt Chamberlain and Lionel Simmons.

Bryant received several awards for his outstanding performance during his senior year at Lower Merion. These included being named Naismith High School Player of the Year, Gatorade Men's National Basketball Player of the Year, a McDonald's All-American, a first-team Parade All-American and a USA Today All-USA First Team player. Bryant's varsity coach, Greg Downer, commented that he was "a complete player who dominates" and praised his work ethic, even as the team's top player. In 1996, Bryant took R&B singer Brandy to her Hollywood High senior prom. Ultimately, the 17-year-old Bryant made the decision to go directly into the NBA, becoming only the sixth player in NBA history to do so. Bryant's news was met with a lot of publicity at a time when prep-to-pro NBA players were not very common (Garnett being the only exception in 20 years). His basketball skills and SAT score of 1080 would have ensured admission to any college he chose, but he did not officially visit any campuses. In 2012, Bryant was honored as one of the 35 Greatest McDonald's All-Americans for his high-school play as well as his later accomplishments.

Professional career

1996 NBA draft

Before the 1996 NBA draft, Bryant had worked out in Los Angeles, where he scrimmaged against former Lakers players Larry Drew and Michael Cooper and, according to then-Laker general manager Jerry West, "marched over these people".

The Lakers were looking to trade their starting center Vlade Divac for a player's draft rights to free up salary cap space to make an offer to free-agent center Shaquille O'Neal. Bill Branch, the Charlotte Hornets' head scout at the time, said that the Hornets agreed to trade their  13 pick to the Lakers the day before the draft. Before the trade agreement, the Hornets never considered drafting Bryant. During the draft, the Lakers told the Hornets whom to select minutes before the pick was made. Bryant was the first guard drafted directly out of high school. After the draft, the trade was put in jeopardy when Divac threatened to retire rather than be traded from Los Angeles. However, on June 30, Divac relented on his threat and the trade was made final on July 9, 1996, when the league's off-season moratorium ended. Since Bryant was still 17 at the time, his parents had to cosign his contract with the Lakers until he was able to sign his own when he turned 18 before the season began. Bryant signed a three-year rookie contract totaling $3.5 million.

Los Angeles Lakers (1996–2016)

Adjusting to the NBA (1996–1999)
Bryant debuted in the Summer Pro League in Long Beach, California, scoring 25 points in front of a standing-room-only crowd. Defenders struggled to get in front of him, and his performance excited West and Lakers coach Del Harris. He scored 36 points in the finale and finished with averages of 24.5 points and 5.3 rebounds in four games. As a rookie in 1996–97, Bryant mostly came off the bench behind guards Eddie Jones and Nick Van Exel. At the time, he was the second-youngest player ever to play in an NBA game (18 years, 72 days) and also became the youngest NBA starter (18 years, 158 days). Initially, Bryant played limited minutes, but as the season continued, he began to see some more playing time.

By the end of the season, he averaged 15.5 minutes a game. During the All-Star weekend, Bryant participated in the Rookie Challenge and won the 1997 Slam Dunk Contest, becoming the youngest dunk champion at the age of 18. Bryant's performance throughout the year earned him a spot on the NBA All-Rookie Second Team with fellow bench teammate Travis Knight.

The Lakers advanced to the Western Conference semifinals in the playoffs against the Utah Jazz, when Bryant was pressed into a lead role at the end of Game 5. Byron Scott missed the game with a sprained wrist, Robert Horry was ejected for fighting with Utah's Jeff Hornacek, and Shaquille O'Neal fouled out with 1:46 remaining in the fourth quarter. Bryant shot four air balls at the end of the game; the Jazz won 98–93 in overtime to eliminate the Lakers 4–1. He first missed a game-winning two-point jump shot in the fourth quarter, and then misfired 3 three-point field goals in overtime, including two tying shots in the final minute. O'Neal commented that "[Bryant] was the only guy who had the guts at the time to take shots like that."

In  Bryant's second season, he received more playing time and began to show more of his abilities as a talented young guard. As a result, Bryant's point averages more than doubled, from 7.6 to 15.4 points per game. Bryant would see an increase in minutes when the Lakers "played small", which would feature Bryant playing small forward alongside the guards he would usually back up. Bryant was the runner-up for the NBA's Sixth Man of the Year Award, and through fan voting, he also became the youngest NBA All-Star starter in NBA history. He was joined by teammates O'Neal, Van Exel, and Jones, making it the first time since 1983 that four players on the same team were selected to play in the same All-Star Game. Bryant's 15.4 points per game was the highest of any non-starter in the season.

The 1998–99 season marked Bryant's emergence as a premier guard in the league. With starting guards Van Exel and Jones traded, Bryant started every game for the lockout-shortened 50-game season. During the season, Bryant signed a six-year contract extension worth $70 million. This kept him with the Lakers until the end of the 2003–04 season. Even at an early stage of his career, sportswriters were comparing his skills to those of Michael Jordan and Magic Johnson. The playoff results, however, were no better, as the Lakers were swept by the San Antonio Spurs in the Western Conference Semifinals.

Three-peat (1999–2002)

Bryant's fortunes would improve when Phil Jackson took over as coach of the Lakers in 1999. After years of steady improvement, Bryant became one of the premier shooting guards in the league, earning appearances in the league's All-NBA, All-Star, and All-Defensive teams. The Lakers became championship contenders behind the center-guard combination of Bryant and O'Neal. Jackson utilized the triangle offense that he implemented to win six championships with the Chicago Bulls; this offense would help both Bryant and O'Neal rise to the elite class of the NBA. Three championships were won consecutively in 2000, 2001, and 2002, further cementing this view.

Bryant was sidelined for six weeks prior to the start of the 1999–2000 season due to a hand injury that he had incurred during a preseason game against the Washington Wizards. When Bryant was back and playing over 38 minutes a game, he had an increase in all statistical categories during the 1999–2000 season. This included leading the team in assists per game and steals per game. The duo of O'Neal and Bryant backed with a strong bench led to the Lakers winning 67 games, tied for fifth-most in NBA history. This followed with O'Neal winning the MVP and Bryant being named to the All-NBA Second Team and All-NBA Defensive Team for the first time in his career (the youngest player to receive All-Defensive honors). While playing second fiddle to O'Neal in the playoffs, Bryant had some clutch performances, including a 25-point, 11-rebound, 7-assist, 4-block game in Game 7 of the Western Conference Finals against the Portland Trail Blazers. He also threw an alley-oop pass to O'Neal to clinch the game and the series. In the 2000 Finals, against the Indiana Pacers, Bryant injured his ankle in the second quarter of Game 2 after landing on the Pacers' Jalen Rose's foot. Rose later admitted he placed his foot under Bryant intentionally. Bryant did not return to the game, and he also missed Game 3 due to the injury. In Game 4, Bryant scored 22 points in the second half and led the team to an OT victory as O'Neal fouled out of the game. Bryant scored the winning shot to put the Lakers ahead 120–118. With a 116–111 victory in Game 6, the Lakers won their first championship since 1988.

Statistically, the 2000–01 season saw Bryant perform similarly to the previous year, but he averaged six more points per game (28.5). It was also the year when disagreements between Bryant and O'Neal began to surface. Once again, Bryant led the team in assists, with five per game. The Lakers, however, only won 56 games, an 11-game dropoff from the previous year. The Lakers would respond by going 15–1 in the playoffs. They easily swept the Portland Trail Blazers in the first round. In the semifinals round, the Lakers swept the Sacramento Kings. In Game 4 against the Kings, Bryant recorded 48 points, 16 rebounds and 3 assists in a 119–113 series-clinching win. They swept the San Antonio Spurs in the Conference Finals to advance to the Finals, before losing their first game against the Philadelphia 76ers in overtime. They would go on to win the next four games and bring their second championship to Los Angeles in as many seasons. During the playoffs, Bryant played heavy minutes which brought his stats up to 29.4 points, 7.3 rebounds, and 6.1 assists per game. In the playoffs, teammate O'Neal declared Bryant the best player in the league. Bryant ended up making the All-NBA Second Team and All-NBA Defensive Team for the second year in a row. In addition, he was also voted to start in the NBA All-Star Game for the third year in a row (no game in 1999).

In the 2001–02 season, Bryant played 80 games for the first time in his career. On January 14, 2002, Bryant recorded a then career-high 56 points to go along with five rebounds and four assists in a 120–81 win over the visiting Memphis Grizzlies. He continued his all-round play by averaging 25.2 points, 5.5 rebounds, and 5.5 assists per game. Bryant also had a career-high 46.9% shooting and once again led his team in assists. He claimed his first All-Star MVP trophy after a 31-point performance in Philadelphia when he was loudly booed by fans as they had throughout the game, stemming from his earlier comment to a 76ers heckler during the Finals that the Lakers were "going to cut your hearts out". While making the All-NBA Defensive Team again, Bryant was also named to the All-NBA First Team for the first time in his career. The Lakers won 58 games that year and finished second in the Pacific Division behind in-state rival Sacramento Kings. Bryant was suspended one game after he punched Reggie Miller of the Indiana Pacers after the Lakers' March 1, 2002 victory over the Pacers.

The road to the Finals would prove a lot tougher than the record run the Lakers had enjoyed the previous year. While the Lakers swept the Blazers and defeated the Spurs 4–1 in the first two rounds of the playoffs, the Lakers did not have home-court advantage against the Sacramento Kings. The series would stretch to seven games, the first time this had happened to the Lakers since the 2000 Western Conference Finals. However, the Lakers were able to beat their division rivals and make their third consecutive NBA Finals appearance. In the 2002 Finals, against the New Jersey Nets, Bryant averaged 26.8 points, 51.4% shooting, 5.8 rebounds, 5.3 assists per game, which included scoring a quarter of the team's points. At age 23, Bryant became the youngest player to win three championships. Bryant's play was notable and praised for his performance in the fourth quarter of games, specifically the last two rounds of the playoffs. This cemented Bryant's reputation as a "clutch player".

Coming up short (2002–2004)

In the first game of the 2002–03 season, Bryant recorded 27 points, 10 rebounds, 5 assists and 4 steals in an 87–82 loss to the visiting Spurs. On November 1, Bryant recorded a triple-double of 33 points, 15 rebounds and 12 assists in a 108–93 win over the LA Clippers. He also set an NBA record for three-pointers in a game on January 7, 2003, when he made 12 against the Seattle SuperSonics. Bryant averaged 30 points per game and embarked on a historic run, posting 40 or more points in nine consecutive games while averaging 40.6 in the entire month of February. In addition, he averaged 6.9 rebounds, 5.9 assists, and 2.2 steals per game, all career-highs to that point. Bryant was once again voted to both the All-NBA and All-Defensive First Teams, and came in third place in voting for the MVP award. After finishing 50–32 in the regular season, the Lakers floundered in the playoffs and lost in the Western Conference semi-finals in six games to the eventual NBA champions San Antonio Spurs.

In the following season, the Lakers were able to acquire NBA All-Stars Karl Malone and Gary Payton to make another push at the NBA championship. Bryant was arrested for sexual assault before the season began. This caused Bryant to miss some games due to court appearances or attend court earlier in the day and travel to play games later on the same day. In the final game of the regular season, the Lakers played the Portland Trail Blazers. Bryant made two buzzer-beaters to win the game and the Pacific Division title. At the end of the fourth quarter, Bryant made a three-pointer with 1.1 seconds left to send it into overtime. The game eventually went to a second overtime, in which Bryant made another three-pointer as time expired to lift the Lakers past the Blazers, 105–104.

With a starting lineup of O'Neal, Malone, Payton, and Bryant, the Lakers were able to reach the NBA Finals. However, they were upset in five games by the Detroit Pistons, who won their first championship since 1990. In that series, Bryant averaged 22.6 points per game and 4.4 assists while shooting 35.1% from the field. Jackson's contract as coach was not renewed, and Rudy Tomjanovich took over. O'Neal was traded to the Miami Heat for Lamar Odom, Caron Butler, and Brian Grant. The following day, Bryant declined a six-year, $100 million offer to sign with the Los Angeles Clippers and re-signed with the Lakers on a seven-year, $136.4 million contract.

Scoring records and playoff upsets (2004–2007)

Bryant was closely scrutinized and criticized during the 2004–05 season with his reputation badly damaged from all that had happened over the previous year. A particularly damaging salvo came when Jackson wrote The Last Season: A Team in Search of Its Soul. The book detailed the events of the Lakers' tumultuous 2003–04 season and has several criticisms of Bryant. In the book, Jackson called Bryant "un-coachable". Midway through the season, Tomjanovich suddenly resigned as Lakers coach, citing the recurrence of health problems and exhaustion. Without Tomjanovich, stewardship of the remainder of the Lakers' season fell to career assistant coach Frank Hamblen. Bryant was the league's second-leading scorer at 27.6 points per game, but he was surrounded by a subpar supporting cast, and the Lakers went 34–48 and missed the playoffs for the first time in over a decade. The year signified a drop in Bryant's overall status in the NBA, as he did not make the NBA All-Defensive Team and was also demoted to the All-NBA Third Team. During the season, Bryant also engaged in public feuds with Malone and Ray Allen.

The 2005–06 season marked a crossroads in Bryant's basketball career. Despite past differences with Bryant, Jackson returned to coach the Lakers. Bryant endorsed the move, and by all appearances, the two men worked together well the second time around, leading the Lakers back into the playoffs. Bryant's individual scoring accomplishments posted resulted in the finest statistical season of his career. On December 20, 2005, Bryant scored 62 points in three quarters against the Dallas Mavericks. Entering the fourth quarter, Bryant outscored the entire Mavericks team 62–61, the only time a player has done this through three quarters since the introduction of the shot clock. When the Lakers faced the Miami Heat on January 16, 2006, Bryant and Shaquille O'Neal made headlines by engaging in handshakes and hugs before the game, signifying a change in the feud that had festered between them. A month later, at the 2006 NBA All-Star Game, the two were seen laughing together.

On January 22, 2006, Bryant scored a career-high 81 points in a 122–104 victory against the Toronto Raptors. In addition to breaking the previous franchise record of 71 set by Elgin Baylor, Bryant's 81-point game was the second-highest point total in NBA history, surpassed only by Chamberlain's 100-point game in 1962. Whereas Chamberlain was fed repeatedly by teammates for inside shots in a blowout win, Bryant created his own shot—mostly from the outside—in a game which the Lakers trailed at halftime by 14 and did not pull away until the fourth quarter. Chamberlain, playing in an era when the games were paced faster and scoring opportunities were more plentiful, accounted for 59 percent of his team's points in Philadelphia's 169–147 win, compared to Bryant scoring 66 percent of the Lakers' 122 points. In that same month, Bryant also became the first player since 1964 to score 45 points or more in four consecutive games, joining Chamberlain and Baylor as the only players to do so. For the month of January, Bryant averaged 43.4 points per game, the eighth highest single month scoring average in NBA history and highest for any player other than Chamberlain. By the end of the 2005–06 season, Bryant set Lakers single-season franchise records for most 40-point games (27) and most points scored (2,832). He won the league's scoring title for the first time by averaging 35.4 points per game, becoming just the fifth player in league history to average at least 35 in a season. Bryant finished in fourth place in the voting for the 2006 NBA Most Valuable Player Award but received 22 first place votes—second only to winner Steve Nash.

Later in the season, it was reported that Bryant would change his jersey number from 8 to 24 at the start of the 2006–07 season. Bryant's first high-school number was 24 before he switched to 33. After the Lakers' season ended, Bryant said on TNT that he wanted 24 as a rookie, but it was unavailable as it was worn by George McCloud, as was 33, retired with Kareem Abdul-Jabbar. Bryant wore 143 at the Adidas ABCD camp and chose 8 by adding those numbers. In the first round of the playoffs, the Lakers played well enough to reach a 3–1 series lead over the Phoenix Suns, culminating with Bryant's overtime-forcing and game-winning shots in Game 4. They came within six seconds of eliminating the second-seeded Suns in Game 6, however, they lost that game 126–118 in overtime. Despite Bryant's 27.9 points per game in the series, the Lakers broke down and ultimately fell to the Suns in seven games. After scoring 50 points on 20 of 35 shooting in the Game 6 loss, Bryant was criticized for only taking three shots in the second half of the 121–90 Game 7 loss to Phoenix.

During the 2006–07 season, Bryant was selected to his ninth All-Star Game appearance, and on February 18, he logged 31 points, 6 assists, and 6 steals, earning his second career All-Star Game MVP trophy. Over the course of the season, Bryant became involved in a number of on-court incidents. On January 28 while attempting to draw contact on a potential game-winning jump shot, he flailed his arm, striking San Antonio Spurs guard Manu Ginóbili in the face with his elbow. Following a league review, Bryant was suspended for the subsequent game at Madison Square Garden against the New York Knicks. The basis given for the suspension was that Bryant had performed an "unnatural motion" in swinging his arm backward. Later, on March 6, he seemed to repeat the motion, this time striking Minnesota Timberwolves guard Marko Jarić. On March 7, the NBA handed Bryant his second one-game suspension. In his first game back on March 9, he elbowed Kyle Korver in the face which was retroactively re-classified as a Type 1 flagrant foul.

On March 16, Bryant scored a season-high 65 points in a home game against the Portland Trail Blazers, which helped end the Lakers 7-game losing streak. This was the second-best scoring performance of his 11-year career. The following game, Bryant recorded 50 points against the Minnesota Timberwolves, after which he scored 60 points in a road win against the Memphis Grizzlies—becoming the second Laker to score three straight 50-plus point games, a feat not seen since Jordan last did it in 1987. The only other Laker to do so was Baylor, who also scored 50+ in three consecutive contests in December 1962. In the following day, in a game against the New Orleans/Oklahoma City Hornets, Bryant scored 50 points, making him the second player in NBA history to have four straight 50-point games behind Chamberlain, who achieved it twice with streaks of five and seven. Bryant finished the year with a total of ten 50-plus point games, surpassed only by Chamberlain. Bryant also won his second straight scoring title that season. Throughout the 2006–07 season, his jersey became the top selling NBA jersey in the United States and China. A number of journalists have attributed the improved sales to Bryant's new number, as well as his continuing All-Star performance on the court. In the 2007 NBA playoffs, the Lakers were once again eliminated in the first round by the Phoenix Suns, 4–1.

Back on top (2007–2010)
On May 27, 2007, ESPN reported that Bryant stated that he wanted to be traded if Jerry West did not return to the team with full authority. Bryant later confirmed his desire for West's return to the franchise but denied stating that he would want to be traded if that did not take place. However, three days later, on Stephen A. Smith's radio program, Bryant expressed anger over a Lakers "insider" who claimed that Bryant was responsible for Shaquille O'Neal's departure from the team, and publicly stated, "I want to be traded." Three hours after making that statement, Bryant stated in another interview that after having a conversation with head coach Jackson, he had reconsidered his decision and backed off his trade request. Bryant was later shown in an infamous amateur video saying that center Andrew Bynum should have been traded for All-Star Jason Kidd.

On December 23, 2007, Bryant became the youngest player (29 years, 122 days) to reach 20,000 points, in a game against the New York Knicks, in Madison Square Garden, after scoring 39 points to go along with 11 rebounds and 8 assists. This record has since been broken by LeBron James. On March 28, Bryant scored a season-high 53 points to go with 10 rebounds in a loss to the Memphis Grizzlies.

Despite an injury to his shooting hand's small finger, described as "a complete tear of the radial collateral ligament, an avulsion fracture, and a volar plate injury at the MCP joint" that occurred in a game on February 5, 2008, Bryant played all 82 games of the regular season instead of opting for surgery. Regarding his injury, he stated, "I would prefer to delay any surgical procedure until after our Lakers season, and this summer's Olympic Games. But, this is an injury that  and the Lakers' medical staff will just have to continue to monitor on a day-to-day basis."

Aided by the trade for All-Star Pau Gasol, Bryant led his team to a West-leading 57–25 record. The Lakers swept the Nuggets in the first round and on May 6, 2008, Bryant was officially announced as the league MVP. He said, "It's been a long ride. I'm very proud to represent this organization, to represent this city." West, who was responsible for bringing Bryant to the Lakers, was on hand at the press conference to observe Bryant receive his MVP trophy from NBA commissioner David Stern. Stern stated, "Kobe deserved it. He's had just another great season. Doesn't surprise me one bit." In addition to winning his MVP award, Bryant was the only unanimous selection to the All-NBA team on May 8, 2008, for the third straight season and sixth time in his career. He would then headline the NBA All-Defensive First Team with Kevin Garnett, receiving 52 points overall including 24 first-place nods, earning his eighth selection.

The Lakers concluded the 2007–08 regular season with a 57–25 record, finishing first in the Western Conference and setting up themselves for a first-round contest against the Nuggets. In Game 1, Bryant, who said he made himself a decoy through most of the game, scored 18 of his 32 points in the final eight minutes to keep Los Angeles safely ahead. That made Denver the first 50-win team to be swept out of the first round of the playoffs since the Memphis Grizzlies fell in four games to the San Antonio Spurs in 2004. In the first game of the next round, against the Jazz, Bryant scored 38 points as the Lakers beat the Jazz in Game 1. The Lakers won the next game as well, but dropped Games 3 and 4, even with Bryant putting up 33.5 points per game. The Lakers then won the next two games to win the semifinals. This set up a Western Conference Finals berth against the San Antonio Spurs. The Lakers defeated the Spurs in five games, sending themselves to the NBA Finals, against the Boston Celtics. This marked the fifth time in Bryant's career, and the first time without O'Neal, that he made the NBA Finals. The Lakers then lost to the Boston Celtics in six games.

In early September 2008, Bryant decided not to have surgery to repair his right pinkie. In the 2008–09 season, the Lakers opened the campaign by winning their first seven games. Bryant led the team to tie the franchise record for most wins to start the season going 17–2, and by the middle of December they compiled a 21–3 record. He was selected to his 11th consecutive All-Star Game as a starter, and was named the Western Conference Player of the Month for December and January in addition to being named Western Conference Player of the week three times. In a game against the Knicks on February 2, 2009, Bryant scored 61 points, setting a record for the most points scored at Madison Square Garden. During the 2009 NBA All-Star Game, Bryant tallied 27 points, 4 assists, 4 rebounds, and 4 steals and was awarded All-Star Game co-MVP with former teammate O'Neal. The Lakers finished the regular season with the best record in the West (65–17). Bryant was runner-up in the MVP voting behind James, and was selected to the All-NBA First Team and All-Defensive First Team for the seventh time in his career.

In the playoffs, the Lakers defeated the Utah Jazz in five games and the Houston Rockets in seven games in the opening two rounds. By finishing off the Denver Nuggets in the Conference Finals in six games, the Lakers earned their second straight trip to the NBA Finals. The Lakers defeated the Orlando Magic in five games. Bryant was awarded his first NBA Finals MVP trophy upon winning his fourth championship, achieving series averages of 32.4 points, 7.4 assists, 5.6 rebounds, 1.4 steals and 1.4 blocks. He became the first player since West in the 1969 NBA Finals to average at least 32.4 points and 7.4 assists for a Finals series and the first since Jordan to average 30 points, 5 rebounds, and 5 assists for a title-winning team in the Finals. Bryant was the league's leading scorer throughout the 2000s decade, accumulating 21,065 points in regular season play between the 1999-00 and 2008–09 seasons.

During the 2009–10 season, Bryant made six game-winning shots including a buzzer-beating, one-legged 3-pointer against the Miami Heat on December 4, 2009. Bryant considered the shot "one of the luckiest he has made". A week later, Bryant suffered an avulsion fracture in his right index finger in a game against the Minnesota Timberwolves. Despite the injury, Bryant elected to continue playing, rather than take any time off to rest the injury. Five days after his finger injury, he made another game-winning shot, after missing on an opportunity in regulation, this time against the Milwaukee Bucks in an overtime game. Bryant also became the youngest player (31 years, 151 days) to reach 25,000 points in his career during the season, surpassing Chamberlain. He continued his dominant clutch plays making yet another game-winning three-pointer against the Sacramento Kings, and what would be the game-winning field goal against the Boston Celtics. The following day, he surpassed West to become the all-time leading scorer in Lakers franchise history. After being sidelined for five games by an ankle injury, Bryant made his return and made another clutch three-pointer to give the Lakers a one-point lead with four seconds remaining against the Memphis Grizzlies. Two weeks later, he made his sixth game-winning shot of the season, against the Toronto Raptors.

On April 2, 2010, Bryant signed a three-year contract extension worth $87 million. Bryant finished the regular season missing four of the final five games, due to injuries to his knee and finger. Bryant suffered multiple injuries throughout the season and as a result, missed nine games. The Lakers began the playoffs as the number one seed in the Western Conference against the Oklahoma City Thunder, eventually defeating them in six games. The Lakers swept the Utah Jazz in the second round and advanced to the Western Conference Finals, where they faced the Phoenix Suns. In Game 2, Bryant finished the game with 13 assists, setting a new playoff career-high; it was the most assists by a Laker in the playoffs since Magic Johnson had 13 in 1996. The Lakers went on to win the series in six games capturing the Western Conference Championship and advancing to the NBA Finals for a third straight season. In a rematch against the 2008 Champion Boston Celtics, Bryant, despite shooting 6 for 24 from the field, led the Lakers back from a 13-point third-quarter deficit in Game 7 to win the championship; he scored 10 of his game-high 23 points in the fourth quarter and finished the game with 15 rebounds. Bryant won his fifth championship and earned his second consecutive NBA Finals MVP award. This marked the first time the Lakers won a Game 7 against the Boston Celtics in the NBA Finals. Bryant said that this was the most satisfying of all of his five championships.

Chasing a sixth championship (2010–2013)

Bryant wanted a sixth championship to match Jordan's total. The Lakers started the 2010–11 season by winning their first eight games. In his ninth game of the season, playing against the Denver Nuggets, Bryant became the youngest player in NBA history to reach 26,000 career points. Bryant also recorded his first triple-double since January 21, 2009. On January 30 against the Celtics, he became the youngest player to score 27,000 points. On February 1, 2011, Bryant became one of seven players with at least 25,000 points, 5,000 rebounds, and 5,000 assists. In Boston on February 10, Bryant scored 20 of his 23 points in the second half as the Lakers rallied from an early 15-point deficit for a 92–86 win over the Celtics. It was the Lakers' first victory of the season against one of the league's top four teams, as they entered the game 0–5 in previous matchups and had been outscored by an average of 11 points. Bryant, selected to his 13th straight All-Star game after becoming the leading vote-getter, had 37 points, 14 rebounds, and three steals in the 2011 All-Star Game and won his fourth All-Star MVP, tying Hall of Famer Bob Pettit for the most All-Star MVP awards. During the season, Bryant moved from 12th to 6th place on the NBA all-time career scoring list, passing John Havlicek, Dominique Wilkins, Oscar Robertson, Hakeem Olajuwon, Elvin Hayes, and Moses Malone. Bryant finished the season averaging less than 20 shots a game, his fewest since the 2003–04 season.

On April 13, 2011, the NBA fined Bryant $100,000 for directing a gay slur at referee Bennie Adams in frustration in the previous day's game. The Gay & Lesbian Alliance Against Defamation praised the NBA's decision to fine Bryant, and the Human Rights Campaign said that Bryant's language was a "disgrace" and "distasteful". Bryant stated that he was open to discussing the matter with gay rights groups and wanted to appeal his fine. He later apologized for the use of the word. Bryant and other Lakers appeared in a Lakers public service announcement denouncing his behavior. The team's quest for another three-peat was ended when they were swept by the Dallas Mavericks in the second round of the playoffs.

Bryant received experimental platelet-rich plasma therapy called Orthokine in Germany to treat the pain on his left knee and ankle, and Mike Brown replaced the retired Jackson as coach of the Lakers in the off-season. Bryant began the season playing with an injured wrist. On January 10, 2012, Bryant scored 48 points against the Suns. "Not bad for the seventh-best player in the league", said Bryant, referring to a preseason ESPN ranking of the NBA's top players. He went on to score 40, 42, and 42 in his next three games. It was the sixth time in his career he scored 40 or more points in four straight games, a feat exceeded only by Chamberlain (19 times). At the 2012 NBA All-Star Game, Bryant scored 27 points to pass Jordan as the career scoring leader in the All-Star Game. He also suffered a broken nose and a concussion in the third quarter of the All-Star Game after a hard foul from Dwyane Wade. In April, Bryant missed seven games with a bruised left shin. He returned three games before the end of the regular season. He sat out season finale against Sacramento, foregoing the chase for a possible third NBA scoring title, having needed 38 points to surpass Kevin Durant. The Lakers were knocked out of the playoffs by Durant and Oklahoma City in the second round of the playoffs, losing in five games in what would be Bryant's final playoff appearance.

The Lakers in 2012–13 acquired center Dwight Howard and point guard Steve Nash. On November 2, 2012, Bryant scored 40 points with two steals, and he passed Magic Johnson (1,724) as the Lakers career leader in steals. However, the Lakers lost the game to the Clippers and started the season 0–3 for the first time in 34 years and just the fourth time in franchise history. After starting the season 1–4, coach Brown was fired. He was replaced by Mike D'Antoni, who Bryant knew as a child when Bryant's father was playing in Italy and D'Antoni was also a star player there. Bryant had grown close with D'Antoni during their time with Team USA. On December 5 against New Orleans, Bryant became the youngest player (34 years and 104 days) in league history to score 30,000 points, joining Hall of Famers Chamberlain, Jordan, Kareem Abdul-Jabbar, and Karl Malone as one of five players to reach that milestone. On December 18, in a 101–100 win over the Charlotte Bobcats, Bryant scored 30+ points in his seventh consecutive game, the longest streak by an NBA player after turning 34 years old; it was the fourth-longest such streak in his career. His streak would be snapped at 10 on December 28 in a 104–87 win over the Portland Trail Blazers, when he scored 27 points, sitting out the whole fourth quarter. In a move to improve the team's defense, D'Antoni began having Bryant guard the opponent's best perimeter player; Bryant was the primary defender on the Cavaliers' Kyrie Irving, who was held to 15 points. Bryant acknowledged he was a more focused defender when he had a challenging defensive assignment as opposed to when he played off the ball against weaker players. His defense disrupted opponents and freed Nash from unfavorable matchups.

Bryant was leading the league in scoring through much of the first 42 games. With a disappointing 17–25 start to the season, D'Antoni had Bryant became the primary facilitator on offense and Nash was moved off the ball and became more of a spot-up shooter. In the next three games, Bryant had at least 10 assists in three wins with a three-game total of 39 assists, the most in his career. He missed a triple-double in each game with nine rebounds twice and eight in the other. In two crucial wins in March, he scored at least 40 points and had at least 10 assists in back-to-back games, becoming the first Laker to accomplish the feat since West in 1970.

With the Lakers fighting to secure the eighth and final playoff berth in the Western Conference, coupled with injuries on the team, Bryant began playing almost all 48 minutes each game. On April 10, 2013, Bryant became the first player in NBA history to get 47 points, eight rebounds, five assists, four blocks, and three steals in an NBA game. On April 12, Bryant suffered a torn Achilles tendon against the Golden State Warriors, ending his season. His injury came while he was playing seven consecutive quarters and at least 40 minutes for seven consecutive games. The 34-year-old Bryant was averaging his most minutes (38.6) in six years, and only Portland rookie Damian Lillard was averaging more minutes. Lakers general manager Mitch Kupchak had spoken to Bryant about his extensive playing time 10 days earlier, but Bryant insisted the minutes needed to continue given the Lakers' playoff push. Bryant had surgery on April 13 to repair the tear, and it was estimated he would miss six to nine months. He ended the season with his customary numbers scoring an average of 27.3 points, 46.3 percent shooting, 5.6 rebounds, and 6 assists. However, The New York Times called his leading of the Lakers back into playoff contention "perhaps some of the finest work of his career." Eight times he reached 40 points during the season, and eleven times he had 10 or more assists in his role as distributor, dubbed "Magic Mamba" after the passing skills of Magic Johnson. Bryant's assists were the second-highest of his career and his field goal percentage was its highest since 2008–09. The Lakers finished the season at 45–37, good for seventh in the West. Playing without Bryant, the Lakers were swept in four games by the San Antonio Spurs in the first round of the playoffs.

Injury-plagued years (2013–2015)

Bryant resumed practicing in November 2013, after the 2013–14 season had already begun. On November 25, he signed a two-year contract extension with the Lakers at an estimated value of $48.5 million. He remained the league's highest-paid player, although he accepted a discounted deal; he had been eligible to receive an extension starting at $32 million per year. Bryant's contract became a polarizing topic, with detractors arguing that stars should take less money to allow their team more financial freedom, while supporters countered that the NBA's biggest stars were being paid less than their true value. Bryant resumed playing on December 8 after missing the season's first 19 games. On December 17, Bryant matched his season high of 21 points in a 96–92 win over Memphis, but he suffered a lateral tibial plateau fracture in his left knee that was expected to sideline him for six weeks. He had played six games since returning from his Achilles injury, which included time at point guard after injuries to Nash, Steve Blake, and Jordan Farmar. Bryant was averaging 13.8 points, 6.3 assists, and 4.3 rebounds. Despite being sidelined, he was voted by fans to start in his 16th All-Star game. Bryant did not feel he was deserving of the selection, and some likened it to a career achievement award for his past performance. However, he missed playing in the game, still hampered by his knee. On March 12, 2014, the Lakers ruled Bryant out for the remainder of the season, citing his need for more rehab and the limited time remaining in the season. At the time, the team was 22–42 and tied for the worst record in the Western Conference. The Lakers finished 27–55 and missed the playoffs for the first time since 2005.

Bryant returned for the 2014–15 season, his 19th season with the Lakers, who had replaced D'Antoni with Bryant's former Lakers teammate, Byron Scott. On November 30, 2014, in a 129–122 overtime victory against the Toronto Raptors, Bryant recorded his 20th career triple-double with 31 points, 12 assists and 11 rebounds. At age 36, he became the oldest NBA player to achieve 30 points, 10 rebounds, and 10 assists in a game. On December 14, Bryant became the NBA's third all-time leading scorer, passing Jordan (32,292) in a 100–94 win against Minnesota. He played in the first 27 games of the season, averaging team-highs with 26.4 points and 35.4 minutes per game while leading the league with 22.4 shots per game. However, Scott held him out for three straight games to rest after one of his worst performances of the season, when Bryant committed nine turnovers and scored 25 points on just 8-for-30 shooting in a 108–101 loss to Sacramento. He was suffering from soreness in his knees, feet, back, and Achilles tendons and Scott planned to reduce his workload going forward. Three times Bryant had exceeded 40 minutes in a game, and the coach blamed himself for overloading him after he started the season in such great shape. For the season, Bryant had been shooting just 37 percent from the field, and the team's record was only 8–19. In his second game back after resting, he had 23 points, 11 assists, and 11 rebounds in a 111–103 win over Denver, and became just the third player in league history to record multiple triple-doubles in a season at age 36 or older. On January 21, 2015, Bryant suffered a rotator cuff tear in his right shoulder while driving baseline for a two-handed dunk against the New Orleans Pelicans. Though he was right-handed, he returned to play in the game and ran the offense while shooting, dribbling, and passing almost exclusively with his left hand. Prior to the injury, Bryant had been rested in 8 of 16 games. He underwent season-ending surgery for the injury, finishing the season averaging 22.3 points but shooting a career-low 37.3 percent, well below his 45.4 percent career mark to start the season. He was expected to be sidelined for nine months with a return targeted toward the start of the 2015–16 season. The Lakers finished the season with a record of 21–61, surpassing the franchise record for most losses in a season that they had set the previous year.

Final season (2015–2016)

After recovering to play in the 2015–16 preseason, Bryant suffered a calf injury and missed the final two weeks of exhibition games. However, he played in the season opener to begin his 20th season with the Lakers, surpassing John Stockton's league record of 19 for the most seasons with the same team. On November 24, 2015, the Lakers fell to 2–12 after losing 111–77 to the Warriors. Bryant scored just four points in 25 minutes on 1-for-14 shooting, matching the worst-shooting game of his career in which he attempted at least five shots. On December 1, 2015, Bryant played his last game against his hometown team, the Philadelphia 76ers, where the Lakers lost 103–91.

On November 29, 2015, Bryant announced via The Players' Tribune that he would be retiring at the end of the season. In his poem titled "Dear Basketball", Bryant wrote that he fell in love with the game at age six: "A love so deep I gave you my all/From my mind & body/To my spirit & soul." The 2015–16 season "is all I have left to give./My heart can take the pounding/My mind can handle the grind/But my body knows it's time to say goodbye./And that's OK./I'm ready to let you go." In a letter distributed to Lakers' fans before that evening's game against the Indiana Pacers, Bryant wrote, "What you've done for me is far greater than anything I've done for you. ... My love for this city, this team and for each of you will never fade. Thank you for this incredible journey."

At the time of his announcement, he was second on the team in minutes (30.8) behind Jordan Clarkson and leading the team with 16.7 field goal attempts per game, while averaging just 15.7 points and shooting a career-low 31.5 percent. His free throw attempts had dropped from his career average, and his game had become over-reliant on pump fakes and long-range shots, making a league-worst 19.5 percent from three-point range while attempting seven a game, almost double his career average. In his press conference after the announcement, he acknowledged his declining skills. "Even though I play like shit, I've worked really, really hard not to play like crap and I do everything I possibly can. And I feel good about that", he said.

Bryant requested that opposing teams on the road not hold any on-court ceremonies in his honor or present him any gifts in public. Prior to announcing his retirement, he had been steadfast about not wanting the fuss of a staged farewell tour, preferring to hear boos instead of cheers. Still, he was honored around the league with video tributes and fan ovations, including arenas that historically jeered him such as TD Garden in Boston, Wells Fargo Center in Philadelphia, Moda Center in Portland, Sleep Train Arena in Sacramento, and Vivint Smart Home Arena in Salt Lake City. Previously, Bryant was respected but not beloved, and he was astonished at the cheers he was now receiving.

On February 3, Bryant made seven three-pointers and scored a then season-high 38 points, including 14 of the team's 18 points in the last 5:02 of the game, for a 119–115 win over the Minnesota Timberwolves. The win ended a 10-game losing streak, and the Lakers averted establishing the longest losing streak in franchise history. He became just the fourth NBA player over 37 years old to log at least 35 points, five rebounds, and five assists in a game. Bryant was the leading overall vote-getter for the 2016 All-Star Game with 1.9 million votes, ahead of Stephen Curry's 1.6 million. Having moved to small forward that season, Bryant was selected as a frontcourt starter for the first time. Playing in his first All-Star game since 2013, Bryant had 10 points, six rebounds, and seven assists. West teammates offered to feed him the ball in an attempt to get him another All-Star MVP, but he declined.

In the season finale on April 13, Bryant scored an NBA season-high 60 points against Utah in his last NBA game, outscoring the entire Jazz team 23–21 in the fourth quarter, in the Lakers' 101–96 victory. He became the oldest player to score 60 or more points in a game at 37 years and 234 days old. The Lakers finished the season with a 17–65 record, their worst record in franchise history.

National team career

Bryant declined to play in the 2000 Olympics because he was getting married in the off-season. He also decided not to play in the 2002 FIBA World Championship. Bryant was originally selected for the FIBA Americas Championship in 2003 but withdrew after undergoing arthroscopic shoulder and knee surgeries. In the following summer, he had to withdraw from the Olympic team because of his sexual assault case. Along with LeBron James, he was one of the first two players to be publicly named to the 2006–2008 U.S. preliminary roster in 2006 by Jerry Colangelo. However, he was once again sidelined after knee surgery and did not participate in the 2006 FIBA World Championship.

Bryant's United States national team career finally began in 2007. He was a member of the 2007 USA Men's Senior National Team and USA FIBA Americas Championship Team that finished 10–0, won gold and qualified the United States men for the 2008 Olympics. He started in all 10 of the USA's FIBA Americas Championship games. Bryant averaged 15.3 points, 2.9 assists, 2.0 rebounds, and 1.6 steals per game in the tournament.

On June 23, 2008, he was named to the USA Men's Senior National Team for the 2008 Summer Olympics. This was his first time going to the Olympics. Bryant scored 20 points, including 13 in the fourth quarter, along with six assists, as Team USA defeated Spain 118–107 in the gold medal game on August 24, 2008, for its first gold medal in a worldwide competition since the 2000 Olympics. He averaged 15.0 points, 2.8 rebounds, and 2.1 assists while shooting .462 from the field in eight Olympic contests.

Bryant rejoined the national team for the 2012 Summer Olympics. After winning another gold medal, Bryant decided to retire from the team. He finished his national team career with a record of 26–0 across three tournaments, winning a gold medal each time.

Player profile

Bryant primarily played as a shooting guard. Bryant has drawn frequent comparisons to Michael Jordan, after whom he modeled his playing style. Like Jordan, he became most known for shooting a fall-away jump shot. Chris Ballard of Sports Illustrated described another of Bryant's most famous moves as the "jab step-and-pause" in which Bryant jabbed his non-pivot foot forward to let the defender relax but instead of bringing the jab foot back, he pushed off of it and drove around his opponent to get to the basket.

Bryant established a reputation for taking shots in the closing moments of tight games, even when he was double or triple-teamed, and was noted as one of the premier closers in the NBA. In a 2012 annual survey of NBA general managers, Bryant was selected for the 10th consecutive season as the player general managers would want to take a clutch shot with a game on the line. Bryant enjoyed being the villain, and reveled in being booed and then silencing the crowd with his play. His ability to make difficult shots has also drawn criticism of his shot selection. Throughout his career, Bryant was disparaged for being a selfish, high-volume shooter; he missed more field goal attempts in his career than any other player in NBA history. Phil Jackson, who coached Bryant for many years, stated that Bryant "tends to force the action, especially when the game isn't going his way. When his shot is off, Kobe will pound away relentlessly until his luck turns." According to Bryant, "I would go 0 for 30 before I would go 0 for 9; 0 for 9 means you beat yourself, you psyched yourself out of the game."

In addition to his abilities on offense, Bryant also established himself as a standout defensive player. Bryant rarely drew charges when he played defense, which he believed spared his body and contributed to his longevity. However, some critics have suggested that Bryant's defensive accolades in his later years were based more on his reputation than his actual play.

Bryant was also lauded for his relentless work ethic, dubbed the "Mamba mentality". Throughout his first 17 seasons, his body was resilient, and he exhibited a high pain threshold while often playing through injuries. A fierce competitor, Bryant made opponents and teammates alike the objects of his scorn. Many players have considered him difficult to play with because of his high level of commitment and performance. According to sportswriter Mark Heisler of Forbes, "circa 2004–2007, Kobe was the most alienated superstar the NBA had ever seen." After the departure of Shaquille O'Neal, he led the Lakers to two NBA championships; during this period, he became more of a mentor to his teammates than he had been earlier in his career. Bryant's longtime head coach Phil Jackson noted a big difference during his two Lakers coaching stints in Bryant's demeanor towards his teammates. If Bryant talked to teammates in his earlier years, it was usually "give me the damn ball," but during the latter period, "[Bryant] embraced the team and his teammates, calling them up when we were on the road and inviting them out to dinner. It was as if the other players were now his partners, not his personal spear-carriers."

Basketball legacy

Bryant was called "one of the greatest players in the history of our game" by NBA commissioner Adam Silver, and The New York Times wrote that he had "one of the most decorated careers in the history of the sport." Reuters called him "arguably the best player of his generation", while both Sporting News and TNT named him their NBA player of the decade for the 2000s. In 2008 and again in 2016, ESPN ranked him the second-greatest shooting guard of all time after Jordan. In 2022, to commemorate the NBA's 75th Anniversary The Athletic ranked their top 75 players of all time, and named Bryant as the 10th greatest player in NBA history, the second highest shooting guard on the list, behind only Jordan. Players including Kevin Durant, Dirk Nowitzki, Dwyane Wade, and Derrick Rose called Bryant their generation's version of Jordan. The Press-Enterprise described Bryant as "maybe the greatest Laker in the organization's history". He was the Lakers' all-time leading scorer, and his five titles are tied for the most in franchise history. Both numbers he wore during his career, 8 and 24, were retired by the Lakers on December 18, 2017. In his first year of eligibility, Bryant was named a finalist for the Naismith Memorial Basketball Hall of Fame, weeks after his death, before being elected a couple of months later in April 2020. His formal induction was delayed until 2021 due to the COVID-19 pandemic. In October 2021, Bryant was honored as one of the league's greatest players of all time by being named to the NBA 75th Anniversary Team.

With career averages of 25.0 points, 5.2 rebounds, 4.7 assists, and 1.4 steals per game, Bryant was considered one of the most complete players in NBA history. He is the fourth-leading scorer in league history with 33,643 points. He was the first player in NBA history to have at least 30,000 career points and 6,000 career assists, and was one of only four players with 25,000 points, 6,000 rebounds, and 6,000 assists. His 81-point performance against Toronto in 2006 was the second-highest in NBA history, behind only Chamberlain's 100. He scored at least 50 points 24 times in his career, which is third in league history behind Jordan (31) and Chamberlain (118); six times Bryant scored at least 60. He was just the third player in NBA history to average 40 points in a calendar month, which he accomplished four times. Bryant was voted the league MVP in 2008 and led his team to the 2008 NBA Finals as the first seed in the Western Conference. In the 2008 Summer Olympics, he won a gold medal as a member of the U.S. men's basketball team, occasionally referred to as "The Redeem Team". He won another gold medal at the 2012 Summer Olympics. He led the Lakers to two more championships in 2009 and 2010, winning the Finals MVP award on both occasions.

Bryant was an 18-time All-Star, which ranks second behind only Kareem Abdul-Jabbar's 19. He was chosen a record 18 straight times, each time as a starter. On four occasions (2003, 2011, 2013, 2016) he was the leading vote-getter. Four times Bryant was named the All-Star MVP, a record he shares with Bob Pettit. He was selected to the All-NBA Team on 15 occasions, tied for the most with Abdul-Jabbar and Tim Duncan, and his 11 first-team honors are tied for the second-most with Karl Malone. Bryant was also a 12-time All-Defensive Team selection, trailing only Duncan's 15, and nine times he was named to the All-Defensive First Team, tied with Jordan, Garnett, and Gary Payton for the most all time. He was the first guard to play 20 seasons in the NBA. He also won the NBA Slam Dunk Contest in 1997 and was its youngest winner. In his career, Bryant scored 40-plus points in 121 games, and 21 times he recorded a triple-double.

During the 2020 NBA playoffs, the Lakers' players wore 'Black Mamba' jerseys in honor of Bryant. Designed by Bryant himself, the black jersey features a snakeskin pattern with yellow accents and 16 stars representing the team's 16 championships at the time. In Game 2 win against the Denver Nuggets in the Western Conference finals, Anthony Davis made a buzzer-beating 3-pointer and yelled Bryant's name, while the team was wearing the 'Black Mamba' jerseys. Following a Game 2 win in the 2020 NBA Finals, LeBron James was asked about the jerseys and had this to say: "It's always special to represent someone that meant so much, not only to the game but also to the Lakers organization for 20-plus years. For us to honor him, being on the floor, this is what it's all about."

On January 26, 2022, coinciding with the 2nd anniversary of his death and the helicopter crash, a statue of Bryant and his daughter Gianna was placed at the site where the crash occurred. Later in February, the NBA redesigned the All-Star Game MVP trophy as part of the major redesign of the All-Star Weekend trophies in celebration of the league’s 75th anniversary season.

NBA career statistics

Regular season

|-
| style="text-align:left;"|
| style="text-align:left;"|L.A. Lakers
| 71 || 6 || 15.5 || .417 || .375 || .819 || 1.9 || 1.3 || .7 || .3 || 7.6
|-
| style="text-align:left;"|
| style="text-align:left;"|L.A. Lakers
| 79 || 1 || 26.0 || .428 || .341 || .794 || 3.1 || 2.5 || .9 || .5 || 15.4
|-
| style="text-align:left;"|
| style="text-align:left;"|L.A. Lakers
| style="background:#cfecec;"|50* || style="background:#cfecec;"|50* || 37.9 || .465 || .267 || .839 || 5.3 || 3.8 || 1.4 || 1.0 || 19.9
|-
| style="text-align:left; background:#afe6ba;"|†
| style="text-align:left;"|L.A. Lakers
| 66 || 62 || 38.2 || .468 || .319 || .821 || 6.3 || 4.9 || 1.6 || .9 || 22.5
|-
| style="text-align:left; background:#afe6ba;"|†
| style="text-align:left;"|L.A. Lakers
| 68 || 68 || 40.9 || .464 || .305 || .853 || 5.9 || 5.0 || 1.7 || .6 || 28.5
|-
| style="text-align:left; background:#afe6ba;"|†
| style="text-align:left;"|L.A. Lakers
| 80 || 80 || 38.3 || .469 || .250 || .829 || 5.5 || 5.5 || 1.5 || .4 || 25.2
|-
| style="text-align:left;"|
| style="text-align:left;"|L.A. Lakers
| 82 || style="background:#cfecec;"|82* || 41.5 || .451 || .383 || .843 || 6.9 || 5.9 || 2.2 || .8 || 30.0
|-
| style="text-align:left;"|
| style="text-align:left;"|L.A. Lakers
| 65 || 64 || 37.6 || .438 || .327 || .852 || 5.5 || 5.1 || 1.7 || .4 || 24.0
|-
| style="text-align:left;"|
| style="text-align:left;"|L.A. Lakers
| 66 || 66 || 40.7 || .433 || .339 || .816 || 5.9 || 6.0 || 1.3 || .8 || 27.6
|-
| style="text-align:left;"|
| style="text-align:left;"|L.A. Lakers
| 80 || 80 || 41.0 || .450 || .347 || .850 || 5.3 || 4.5 || 1.8 || .4 || style="background:#cfecec;"|35.4*
|-
| style="text-align:left;"|
| style="text-align:left;"|L.A. Lakers
| 77 || 77 || 40.8 || .463 || .344 || .868 || 5.7 || 5.4 || 1.4 || .5 || style="background:#cfecec;"|31.6*
|-
| style="text-align:left;"|
| style="text-align:left;"|L.A. Lakers
| style="background:#cfecec;"|82* || style="background:#cfecec;"|82* || 38.9 || .459 || .361 || .840 || 6.3 || 5.4 || 1.8 || .5 || 28.3
|-
| style="text-align:left; background:#afe6ba;"|†
| style="text-align:left;"|L.A. Lakers
| style="background:#cfecec;"|82* || style="background:#cfecec;"|82* || 36.1 || .467 || .351 || .856 || 5.2 || 4.9 || 1.5 || .5 || 26.8
|-
| style="text-align:left; background:#afe6ba;"|†
| style="text-align:left;"|L.A. Lakers
| 73 || 73 || 38.8 || .456 || .329 || .811 || 5.4 || 5.0 || 1.5 || .3 || 27.0
|-
| style="text-align:left;"|
| style="text-align:left;"|L.A. Lakers
| 82 || style="background:#cfecec;"|82* || 33.9 || .451 || .323 || .828 || 5.1 || 4.7 || 1.2 || .1 || 25.3
|-
| style="text-align:left;"|
| style="text-align:left;"|L.A. Lakers
| 58 || 58 || 38.5 || .430 || .303 || .845 || 5.4 || 4.6 || 1.2 || .3 || 27.9
|-
| style="text-align:left;"|
| style="text-align:left;"|L.A. Lakers
| 78 || 78 || 38.6 || .463 || .324 || .839 || 5.6 || 6.0 || 1.4 || .3 || 27.3
|-
| style="text-align:left;"|
| style="text-align:left;"|L.A. Lakers
| 6 || 6 || 29.5 || .425 || .188 || .857 || 4.3 || 6.3 || 1.2 || .2 || 13.8
|-
| style="text-align:left;"|
| style="text-align:left;"|L.A. Lakers
| 35 || 35 || 34.5 || .373 || .293 || .813 || 5.7 || 5.6 || 1.3 || .2 || 22.3
|-
| style="text-align:left;"|
| style="text-align:left;"|L.A. Lakers
| 66 || 66 || 28.2 || .358 || .285 || .826 || 3.7 || 2.8 || .9 || .2 || 17.6
|- class="sortbottom"
| style="text-align:center;" colspan="2"|Career
| 1,346 || 1,198 || 36.1 || .447 || .329 || .837 || 5.2 || 4.7 || 1.4 || .5 || 25.0
|- class="sortbottom"
| style="text-align:center;" colspan="2"|All-Star
| 15 || 15 || 27.6 || .500 || .324 || .789 || 5.0 || 4.7 || 2.5 || .4 || 19.3

Playoffs

|-
| style="text-align:left;"|1997
| style="text-align:left;"|L.A. Lakers
| 9 || 0 || 14.8 || .382 || .261 || .867 || 1.2 || 1.2 || .3 || .2 || 8.2
|-
| style="text-align:left;"|1998
| style="text-align:left;"|L.A. Lakers
| 11 || 0 || 20.0 || .408 || .214 || .689 || 1.9 || 1.5 || .3 || .7 || 8.7
|-
| style="text-align:left;"|1999
| style="text-align:left;"|L.A. Lakers
| 8 || 8 || 39.4 || .430 || .348 || .800 || 6.9 || 4.6 || 1.9 || 1.3 || 19.8
|-
| style="text-align:left; background:#afe6ba;"|2000†
| style="text-align:left;"|L.A. Lakers
| 22 || 22 || 39.0 || .442 || .344 || .754 || 4.5 || 4.4 || 1.5 || 1.5 || 21.1
|-
| style="text-align:left; background:#afe6ba;"|2001†
| style="text-align:left;"|L.A. Lakers
| 16 || 16 || 43.4 || .469 || .324 || .821 || 7.3 || 6.1 || 1.6 || .8 || 29.4
|-
| style="text-align:left; background:#afe6ba;"|2002†
| style="text-align:left;"|L.A. Lakers
| 19 || 19 || 43.8 || .434 || .379 || .759 || 5.8 || 4.6 || 1.4 || .9 || 26.6
|-
| style="text-align:left;"|2003
| style="text-align:left;"|L.A. Lakers
| 12 || 12 || 44.3 || .432 || .403 || .827 || 5.1 || 5.2 || 1.2 || .1 || 32.1
|-
| style="text-align:left;"|2004
| style="text-align:left;"|L.A. Lakers
| 22 || 22 || 44.2 || .413 || .247 || .813 || 4.7 || 5.5 || 1.9 || .3 || 24.5
|-
| style="text-align:left;"|2006
| style="text-align:left;"|L.A. Lakers
| 7 || 7 || 44.9 || .497 || .400 || .771 || 6.3 || 5.1 || 1.1 || .4 || 27.9
|-
| style="text-align:left;"|2007
| style="text-align:left;"|L.A. Lakers
| 5 || 5 || 43.0 || .462 || .357 || .919 || 5.2 || 4.4 || 1.0 || .4 || 32.8
|-
| style="text-align:left;"|2008
| style="text-align:left;"|L.A. Lakers
| 21 || 21 || 41.1 || .479 || .302 || .809 || 5.7 || 5.6 || 1.7 || .4 || 30.1
|-
| style="text-align:left; background:#afe6ba;"|2009†
| style="text-align:left;"|L.A. Lakers
| 23 || 23 || 40.8 || .457 || .349 || .883 || 5.3 || 5.5 || 1.7 || .9 || 30.2
|-
| style="text-align:left; background:#afe6ba;"|2010†
| style="text-align:left;"|L.A. Lakers
| 23 || 23 || 40.1 || .458 || .374 || .842 || 6.0 || 5.5 || 1.3 || .7 || 29.2
|-
| style="text-align:left;"|2011
| style="text-align:left;"|L.A. Lakers
| 10 || 10 || 35.4 || .446 || .293 || .820 || 3.4 || 3.3 || 1.6 || .3 || 22.8
|-
| style="text-align:left;"|2012
| style="text-align:left;"|L.A. Lakers
| 12 || 12 || 39.7 || .439 || .283 || .832 || 4.8 || 4.3 || 1.3 || .2 || 30.0
|- class="sortbottom"
| style="text-align:center;" colspan="2"|Career
| 220 || 200 || 39.3 || .448 || .331 || .816 || 5.1 || 4.7 || 1.4 || .6 || 25.6

Off the court

Personal life

Bryant was the youngest of three children. He grew up with two older sisters, Sharia and Shaya, and had a close relationship with them until his death.

In November 1999, 21-year-old Bryant met 17-year-old Vanessa Laine while she was working as a background dancer on the Tha Eastsidaz music video "G'd Up". Bryant was in the building and working on his debut album. The two began dating and became engaged six months later in May 2000, while Laine was still a senior at Marina High School in Huntington Beach, California. To avoid media scrutiny, she finished high school through independent study. According to Vanessa's cousin Laila Laine, there was no prenuptial agreement. Laila said Bryant "loved her too much for one".

They married on April 18, 2001, at St. Edward the Confessor Catholic Church in Dana Point, California. The wedding was not attended by Bryant's parents, his two sisters, his longtime advisor and agent Arn Tellem, or his Laker teammates. Bryant's parents were opposed to the marriage for a number of reasons. Reportedly Bryant's parents had problems with him marrying so young, especially to a woman who was not African-American. This disagreement resulted in an estrangement period of over two years, which ended when the couple's first daughter was born.

The Bryants' first daughter, Natalia, was born in January 2003. The birth resulted in a reconciliation between Bryant and his parents. Due to an ectopic pregnancy, Vanessa suffered a miscarriage in the spring of 2005. Their second daughter, Gianna Maria-Onore (also referred to as "Gigi"), was born in May 2006. On December 16, 2011, Vanessa Bryant filed for divorce, citing irreconcilable differences, and the couple requested joint custody of their daughters. On January 11, 2013, Bryant and his wife both announced via social media that they had called off their divorce. In early December 2016, Vanessa gave birth to their third daughter, and in January 2019 the Bryants announced they were expecting a fourth daughter. Their daughter was born in June 2019.

Bryant was a practicing Catholic. He said his faith and a priest helped him through difficult times, such as the period following his accusation of rape. A Catholic cantor said she was inspired by Bryant's faith, and the respect that he showed her. Bryant and his family were regular attendees at Our Lady Queen of Angels Catholic Church in Newport Beach. Bryant and his daughter, Gianna, received the Eucharist together just hours before they died.

Bryant was multilingual. He was fluent in English, Italian and Spanish. Inspired by the codename for Uma Thurman's character in the Kill Bill films, Bryant assigned himself the nickname of "Black Mamba", citing a desire for his basketball skills to mimic the eponymous snake's ability to "strike with 99% accuracy at maximum speed, in rapid succession." During the 2012–13 season, he began referring to himself as "vino" to describe how his play had been aging like a fine wine.

In January 2002, Bryant bought a Mediterranean-style house for $4 million, located on a cul-de-sac in Newport Coast, Newport Beach. He sold the house in May 2015.

In 2013, Bryant had a legal disagreement with an auction house over memorabilia from his early years that his mother had put up for auction. Bryant's mother received $450,000 from the auction house for the items, and contended Bryant had given her the rights to the items he had remaining in her home. However, Bryant's lawyers asked the auction house to return the items. Before the scheduled trial, a settlement was reached allowing the auction house the sale of less than 10% of the items. Bryant's parents apologized to him for the misunderstanding in a written statement, and appreciated the financial support he had given them over the years.

Bryant was a lifelong fan of his hometown NFL team, the Philadelphia Eagles. He was also a fan of soccer teams Barcelona, AC Milan, and Manchester City.

According to Forbes, Bryant's $680 million in career earnings was the most ever by a team athlete during their playing career.

He is also a second cousin of his former Lakers teammate Cedric Ceballos.

Sexual assault case

In the summer of 2003, the sheriff's office of Eagle, Colorado, arrested Bryant in connection with an investigation of a sexual assault complaint filed by a 19-year-old hotel employee. Bryant had checked into The Lodge and Spa at Cordillera in Eagle County in advance of undergoing knee surgery nearby. The accuser stated that Bryant raped her in his hotel room the night before Bryant was to have the procedure. Bryant admitted to an adulterous sexual encounter with his accuser but denied her sexual assault allegation.

The accusation tarnished Bryant's reputation, and the public's perception of him plummeted; his endorsement contracts with McDonald's and Nutella were terminated. Sales for Bryant's replica jersey fell significantly. In September 2004, the assault case was dropped by prosecutors after the accuser decided not to testify at the trial. Afterward, Bryant agreed to apologize to her for the incident, including his public mea culpa: "Although I truly believe this encounter between us was consensual, I recognize now that she did not and does not view this incident the same way I did. After months of reviewing discovery, listening to her attorney, and even her testimony in person, I now understand how she feels that she did not consent to this encounter." The accuser filed a separate lawsuit against Bryant, which the two sides settled privately.

Endorsements

Before starting the 1996–97 season, Bryant signed a six-year contract with Adidas that was worth approximately $48 million. His first signature shoe was the Equipment KB 8. Bryant's other, earlier endorsements included deals with The Coca-Cola Company to endorse their Sprite soft drink, appearing in advertisements for McDonald's, promoting Spalding's new NBA Infusion Ball, Upper Deck, Italian chocolate company Ferrero SpA's brand Nutella, Russell Corporation, and appearing on his own series of video games by Nintendo. Many companies like McDonald's and Ferrero SpA terminated his contracts when rape allegations against him became public. A notable exception was Nike, Inc., who had signed him to a five-year, $40–45 million contract just before the incident. However, they refused to use his image or market a new shoe of his for the year but eventually did start promoting Bryant once his image recovered two years later. He has since resumed endorsement deals with The Coca-Cola Company, through their subsidiary Energy Brands, to promote their Vitamin Water brand of drinks. Bryant was also the cover athlete for NBA '07: Featuring the Life Vol. 2 and appeared in commercials for the video games Guitar Hero World Tour (with Tony Hawk, Michael Phelps, and Alex Rodriguez) in 2008 and Call of Duty: Black Ops (alongside Jimmy Kimmel) in 2010.

In a 2008 video promoting Nike's Hyperdunk shoes, Bryant appears to jump over a speeding Aston Martin. The stunt was considered to be fake, and the Los Angeles Times said a real stunt would probably be a violation of Bryant's Lakers contract. After promoting Nike's Hyperdunk shoes, Bryant came out with the fourth edition of his signature line by Nike, the Zoom Kobe IV. In 2010 Nike launched another shoe, Nike Zoom Kobe V. In 2009, Bryant signed a deal with Nubeo to market the "Black Mamba collection", a line of sports/luxury watches that range from $25,000 to $285,000. On February 9, 2009, Bryant was featured on the cover of ESPN The Magazine. However, it was not for anything basketball related; rather, it was about Bryant being a big fan of FC Barcelona. CNN estimated Bryant's endorsement deals in 2007 to be worth $16 million a year. In 2010, Bryant was ranked third behind Tiger Woods and Jordan in Forbes list of the world's highest-paid athletes with $48 million.

On December 13, 2010, Bryant signed a two-year endorsement deal with Turkey's national airline, Turkish Airlines. The deal involved Bryant being in a promotional film to be aired in over 80 countries in addition to his being used in digital, print and billboard advertising.

In September 2012, Bryant shot a commercial for Turkish Airlines with FC Barcelona star Lionel Messi. In the airline's latest commercial, the duo competes to win the attention of a young boy. In 2013, Forbes listed Bryant the fifth highest paid sports star in the world behind Floyd Mayweather, Cristiano Ronaldo, LeBron James and Lionel Messi.

Bryant appeared as the cover athlete for the following video games:
 Kobe Bryant in NBA Courtside
 NBA Courtside 2: Featuring Kobe Bryant
 NBA Courtside 2002
 NBA 3 on 3 Featuring Kobe Bryant
 NBA '07: Featuring the Life Vol. 2
 NBA 09: The Inside
 NBA 2K10
 NBA 2K17 (Legend Edition; Legend Edition Gold)
 NBA 2K21 (Mamba Forever Edition)

Bryant was also one of the global ambassadors of the 2019 FIBA Basketball World Cup in China.

Music
In high school, Bryant was a member of a rap group called CHEIZAW, named after the Chi Sah gang in the martial arts film Kid with the Golden Arm. The group was signed by Sony Entertainment, but the company's ultimate goal was to eliminate the group and have Bryant record on his own. The label wanted to capitalize on Bryant's youth and NBA fame. He performed at a 1997 concert by Sway & King Tech and recorded a verse for a remix of Brian McKnight's "Hold Me". Bryant even appeared on Lakers teammate O'Neal's Respect, starting the track "3 X's Dope", though Bryant's name was not listed on the credits.

Sony pushed Bryant from his roots of underground hip hop into a more radio-friendly sound. His debut album, Visions, was scheduled to release in the spring of 2000. The first single, "K.O.B.E'", featured supermodel Tyra Banks singing the hook. The single debuted in January 2000, and was performed at NBA All-Star Weekend that month; the song was not well received. Sony abandoned plans for the album, which was never released, and dropped Bryant later that year. The Sony president who originally signed Bryant had already left, and Bryant's other backers had mostly abandoned him. Afterward, Bryant co-founded an independent record label, Heads High Entertainment, but it folded within a year. In 1999, Bryant appeared on a remix of "Say My Name" by Destiny's Child on the Maxi single version of the song.

In 2011, Bryant was featured in Taiwanese singer Jay Chou's single "The Heaven and Earth Challenge" (天地一鬥, pronounced "Tian Di Yi Dou"). The proceeds for downloads of both the single and ringtones were donated to impoverished schools for basketball facilities and equipment. The music video of the single also features Bryant. The song was also used by Sprite in its 2011 marketing campaign in China.

In 2009, American rapper Lil Wayne released a song called "Kobe Bryant". Similarly, in 2010, American rapper Sho Baraka released a song called "Kobe Bryant On'em", which was featured on his album Lions and Liars. In 2012, American rapper Chief Keef released a song paying tribute to Kobe Bryant called "Kobe". It was featured on his debut studio album, Finally Rich, as a part of the deluxe edition.

Film and television
Bryant made his acting debut in 1996, appearing in an episode of Moesha. He met the show's star, Brandy, earlier in the year at a Nike All-Star basketball game, and then a couple of months later in May 1996, Bryant was Brandy's date to her Hollywood High School senior prom. That same year, he guest starred as himself on an episode of Arli$$ (episode: "What About the Fans?") and Sister, Sister (episode: "Kid-Napped"). In 1997, he appeared on an episode of Hang Time, this was followed by a guest appearance on the Nickelodeon sketch comedy series All That (1998). Bryant was also the first choice for the role of Jesus Shuttlesworth in Spike Lee's 1998 film He Got Game, but he turned down the role, saying "this summer is too big for me."

Bryant was the subject of Spike Lee's 2009 documentary film Kobe Doin' Work, which chronicled Bryant during the 2007–08 NBA season.

In 2018, Bryant became the first African-American to win the Academy Award for Best Animated Short Film and the first former professional athlete to be nominated and to win an Academy Award in any category for his film Dear Basketball. Despite winning the Oscar, he was denied membership into the Academy of Motion Pictures Arts and Sciences due to his past sexual abuse case and their new set of standards of conduct within the recent MeToo movement. The film also won the Annie Award for Best Animated Short Subject and a Sports Emmy Award. The film was produced by Bryant's production company, Granity Studios. In addition to future animation projects, he had been in talks with animator veteran Bruce Smith for the last six months before his death about starting his own animation studio.

Beginning in 2018, Bryant wrote, produced and hosted the television series Detail, which aired for multiple seasons on ESPN and ESPN+. It featured his insights into the game of basketball and in-depth analyses of games and individual players. He also appeared on MTV's Ridiculousness in 2019.

Filmography

Philanthropy
Bryant was the official ambassador for After-School All-Stars (ASAS), an American non-profit organization that provides comprehensive after-school programs to children in thirteen US cities. Bryant also started the Kobe Bryant China Fund which partnered with the Soong Ching Ling Foundation, a charity backed by the Chinese government. The Kobe Bryant China Fund raises money within China earmarked for education and health programs. On November 4, 2010, Bryant appeared alongside Zach Braff at the Call of Duty: Black Ops launch event at the Santa Monica Airport, where they presented a $1 million check to the Call of Duty Endowment, an Activision-founded nonprofit organization that helps veterans transition to civilian careers after their military service has ended.

Together with his wife, Bryant founded the Kobe and Vanessa Bryant Family Foundation (KVBFF). Its goals are "helping young people in need, encouraging the development of physical and social skills through sports and assisting the homeless". Bryant spoke of the injustice aimed at homeless people who are blamed for their situation, saying that homelessness should not be ignored or made a low priority. Bryant said he wanted more out of life than just a successful basketball career.

Bryant and his wife Vanessa were founding donors of the National Museum of African American History and Culture, with Bryant also donating his uniform he that he wore in the 2008 NBA Finals, the year he was named the league MVP. During his lifetime, Bryant granted over two hundred requests for the Make-A-Wish Foundation.

Business ventures
Bryant established Kobe Inc. to own and grow brands in the sports industry. The initial investment was a 10% stake in the Bodyarmor SuperDrink company for $6 million in March 2014. The headquarters are in Newport Beach, California. With The Coca-Cola Company purchasing a minority stake in the company in August 2018, the valuation of Bryant's stake rose to approximately $200 million.

In 2013, Bryant launched a production company called Granity Studios, which developed different media, ranging from films to television shows and novels.

On August 22, 2016, Bryant and his business partner Jeff Stibel launched Bryant-Stibel, a venture capital firm focused on different businesses including media, data, gaming, and technology, with $100 million in funding. In 2018, Bryant and Sports Academy launched Mamba Sports Academy, a joint athletic-training business venture. The academy established locations in Thousand Oaks and Redondo Beach, California.

Books
On October 23, 2018, Bryant's book The Mamba Mentality: How I Play, with photographs and afterword by Andrew D. Bernstein, an introduction by Phil Jackson, and a foreword by Pau Gasol, was published by MCD / Farrar, Straus and Giroux. The book looks back on his career with photos and his reflections.

At the time of his death, he was working with Brazilian author Paulo Coelho on a children's book aimed at inspiring underprivileged children. After Bryant's death, Coelho deleted the draft, saying in an interview that "it didn't make any sense to publish without him." He did not say how many pages had been written or whether the book had a title.

Bryant also co-wrote/produced several young adult novels through Granity Studios: The Wizenard Series: Training Camp, Legacy and the Queen, and Epoca: The Tree of Ecrof. A fourth novel, The Wizenard Series: Season One, was released posthumously in March 2020. The Wizarenard Series: Season One topped the New York Times middle-grade hardcover list.

Death

Accident
At 9:06a.m. Pacific Standard Time on January 26, 2020, a Sikorsky S-76 helicopter departed from John Wayne Airport in Orange County, California, with nine people aboard: Bryant, his 13-year-old daughter Gianna, six family friends, and the pilot, Ara Zobayan. The helicopter was registered to the Fillmore-based Island Express Holding Corp., according to the California Secretary of State business database. The group was traveling to Camarillo Airport in Ventura County for a basketball game at Mamba Sports Academy in Thousand Oaks.

Due to light rain and fog that morning, the Los Angeles Police Department helicopters and most other air traffic were grounded. The flight tracker showed that the helicopter circled above the L.A. Zoo due to heavy air traffic in the area. At 9:30 a.m., Zobayan contacted the Burbank Airport's control tower, notifying the tower of the situation, and was told he was "flying too low" to be tracked by radar. At that time, the helicopter experienced extreme fog and turned south towards the mountains.

Bryant, his daughter, and the other seven occupants were all killed on impact. Initial reports indicated that the helicopter crashed in the hills above Calabasas in heavy fog. Witnesses reported hearing a helicopter struggling before crashing.

Investigations
On January 28, Bryant's identity was officially confirmed using fingerprints. The following day, the Los Angeles County Department of Medical Examiner-Coroner stated that the official cause of death for him and the eight others on the helicopter was blunt force trauma.

The Federal Aviation Administration, National Transportation Safety Board, and the FBI launched investigations into the crash. 
The cause of the crash was hard to investigate, as the helicopter was not equipped with a black box. Over a year after the crash, on February 9, 2021, the NTSB declared that pilot Ara Zobayan probably became disoriented after flying into thick clouds. The five board members also said Zobayan, who also died in the crash, ignored his training and violated federal regulations during the 40-minute flight.

On February 28, 2023, Vanessa Bryant was awarded a $28.85 million settlement from Los Angeles County to conclude legal proceedings over graphic photos of the aftermath of the helicopter crash that were shared without the permission of the family. The figure includes the $15 million she was awarded from L.A. County in a 2022 civil trial, with “additional funds to settle potential claims from her daughters”—20-year-old Natalia, Bianka (6), and Capri (3). Chris Chester, a co-plaintiff who lost his 45-year-old wife and 13-year-old daughter in the crash, settled for $19.95 million.

Tributes and funeral services

On February 7, Bryant and his daughter were buried in a private funeral in Pacific View Memorial Park in the Corona del Mar neighborhood of Newport Beach, California. A public memorial service was held on February 24 (2/24, marking both Kobe's and Gianna's jersey numbers) at Staples Center with Jimmy Kimmel hosting. Speakers at the service included Vanessa, Jordan, and O'Neal, along with Phoenix Mercury guard Diana Taurasi and Geno Auriemma, Taurasi's coach at Connecticut, where Gianna had been aspiring to play.

The NBA had postponed the Lakers' game against the Clippers just two days after the accident on January 28—the first time an NBA game was postponed for any reason since the 2013 Boston Marathon bombing led to the postponement of a Celtics game. On January 30, the first game after the crash was played at Staples Center between the Clippers and the Kings; the Clippers honored Bryant before the game, with Southern California native Paul George narrating a video tribute to Bryant. The next day, the Lakers played their first game after the crash against the Trail Blazers. Ahead of the match, the Lakers paid tribute to Bryant and all who lost their lives in the crash with a ceremony held just before tip-off, with Usher singing "Amazing Grace" and Boyz II Men singing the National Anthem, while Wiz Khalifa and Charlie Puth reunited to perform "See You Again"—originally their tribute to Paul Walker after his death while filming Furious 7—at halftime. James also delivered a speech to the crowd before the game, and every player in the Lakers starting lineup was announced with Bryant's name. The game was the second-most-watched in ESPN history, averaging 4.41 million viewers.

Also, beginning with the Spurs and the Raptors in their game in San Antonio on the day of the crash, teams paid tribute to Bryant at the start of their games with intentional on-court violations referring to his uniform numbers on their first possession—either a 24-second shot clock or an 8-second backcourt violation. On February 15, NBA commissioner Adam Silver announced that the All-Star Game MVP Award would be renamed to the NBA All-Star Game Kobe Bryant Most Valuable Player in Bryant's honor. In May 2020, the Mamba Sports Academy was renamed to Sports Academy out of respect for Bryant.

The 62nd Annual Grammy Awards went ahead as scheduled at the Staples Center on the day of the crash, but included tributes by multiple artists and groups, including host Alicia Keys opening the show with a tribute speech in which she called Staples Center "the house that Kobe Bryant built" and joining Boyz II Men to sing "It's So Hard to Say Goodbye to Yesterday". 

Bryant also appeared at the start of the In Memoriam segment of the 92nd Academy Awards following his Oscar in 2018 for Dear Basketball, and Spike Lee wore a suit in tribute to him at the ceremony. He was not included in the montages at the 2020 VMAs and Emmys, held later in the year. Fans were upset at the omission, especially as actors Naya Rivera and Chadwick Boseman had been featured prominently in both; after Rivera and Boseman's unexpected deaths in July and August 2020 respectively, the three young black celebrities were popularly compared. 

The 2020 Pro Bowl was also played at Camping World Stadium in Orlando on the day of the crash, and before kickoff, NFC players who learned of Bryant's death conducted a prayer led by Seattle Seahawks quarterback Russell Wilson, while various on-field and PA tributes were made during the game.

After the Lakers beat the Miami Heat in Game 6 of the 2020 NBA Finals to clinch the franchise's 17th NBA championship, rapper, Lakers fan and Long Beach native Snoop Dogg paid homage to Bryant and the Lakers with a full forearm tattoo. Bryant was posthumously inducted into the Basketball Hall of Fame in 2021, with Vanessa delivering the acceptance speech on Bryant's behalf.

See also

 Forbes' list of the world's highest-paid athletes
 List of National Basketball Association career playoff scoring leaders
 List of National Basketball Association career scoring leaders
 List of National Basketball Association seasons played leaders
 List of National Basketball Association single-game scoring leaders
 List of NBA players who have spent their entire career with one franchise
 List of Olympic medalists in basketball
 List of people from Philadelphia
 List of second-generation National Basketball Association players

Notes

References

Further reading

External links

 
 

 
1978 births
2020 deaths
Accidental deaths in California
African-American basketball players
African-American Catholics
American expatriate basketball people in Italy
American men's basketball players
American philanthropists
American podcasters
Basketball players at the 2008 Summer Olympics
Basketball players at the 2012 Summer Olympics
Basketball players from Los Angeles
Basketball players from Philadelphia
Burials at Pacific View Memorial Park
Catholics from California
Catholics from Pennsylvania
Charlotte Hornets draft picks
Deaths from fire in the United States
Los Angeles Lakers players
Lower Merion High School alumni
McDonald's High School All-Americans
Medalists at the 2008 Summer Olympics
Medalists at the 2012 Summer Olympics
Naismith Memorial Basketball Hall of Fame inductees
National Basketball Association All-Stars
National Basketball Association high school draftees
National Basketball Association players with retired numbers
Olympic gold medalists for the United States in basketball
Parade High School All-Americans (boys' basketball)
Philanthropists from California
Philanthropists from Pennsylvania
Producers who won the Best Animated Short Academy Award
Shooting guards
Sportspeople from Newport Beach, California
United States men's national basketball team players
Victims of aviation accidents or incidents in 2020
Victims of helicopter accidents or incidents in the United States